The name Isa or Issa has been used for three tropical cyclones worldwide.

In the Northwest Pacific Ocean:
 Typhoon Isa (1997) (T9701, 02W) – super typhoon; damage in the Guam National Weather Service area of responsibility totaled $1 million (1997 USD, $  USD).

In the South Pacific Ocean:
 Cyclone Isa (1970) – formed near the Solomon Islands.

In the South-West Indian Ocean:
 Subtropical Depression Issa (2022) – exacerbated catastrophic floodings in KwaZulu-Natal, SouthAfrica.

Australian region cyclone set index articles
Pacific typhoon set index articles
South-West Indian Ocean cyclone set index articles